Cipangopaludina cathayensis is a species of large, freshwater snail with an operculum and a gill, an aquatic gastropod mollusk in the family Viviparidae, the river snails.

Taxonomy
This species was described under the name Paludina catayensis by French Jesuit Pierre Marie Heude in 1890. Later reviewers treated the specific name catayensis as an orthographic error and changed the specific name to cathayensis. There is high intraspecific variation of shells within the genus Cipangopaludina, so Wilhelm Kobelt (1909) considered this taxon as a subspecies of Vivipara chinensis. Later authors Yen (1943), Liu (1991) and Lu et al (2014) considered this taxon as a separate species.

Distribution
The species has a wide distribution throughout central and southeastern China, occurring in East China (provinces Shandong, Anhui, Jiangsu, Zhejiang, Jiangxi), Northeast China (Jilin), North China (Shanxi, Hebei) and Central China (Henan, Hubei, Hunan).

Description
The width of the shell is 24.3–50.5 mm. The height of the shell is 27.7–58.5 mm. The shell has from five to six whorls. The apex is pointed.

C. cathayensis has gills and an operculum. The kidney is triple-shaped. The diploid chromosome number of C. cathayensis is 2n=18. The complete mitochondrial genome of Cipangopaludina cathayensis is known since 2014. Its length is 17,157 bp.

Ecology
It inhabits lakes, reservoirs and ponds, as well as grassy paddies, where it clings to aquatic plants.

Each gravid female carries more than 60 embryos inside her. The shell of embryo has three whorls.

The pollutant removal in constructed wetlands with these snails was better, that in constructed wetland without them.<ref>{{cite journal | last1 = Li | first1 = P. | last2 = Zhang | first2 = J. | last3 = Xie | first3 = H. | last4 = Hu | first4 = Z. | last5 = He | first5 = H. | last6 = Wang | first6 = W. | year = 2015 | title = Effects of Misgurnus anguillicaudatus and Cipangopaludina cathayensis on Pollutant Removal and Microbial Community in Constructed Wetlands | journal = Water | volume = 7 | issue = 5| pages = 2422–2434 | doi = 10.3390/w7052422 | doi-access = free }}</ref>

Parasites of Cipangopaludina cathayensis include trematode Aspidogaster conchicola.

Human use

It is used as human food and in the preparation of medicines, and as feed for fish, poultry and livestock. It is also used as a fertilizer.

References

Further reading
 Gao M. X. & Yao X. D. (2005). "Research on Taurine Extraction in River-Snail". Journal of Jianghan Petroleum Institute (Social Science Edition) 8: 27. abstract.
 Lei Y. L., Yin W. Z., Zhang Y., Dong W. W. & Tang Z. Y. (2012). "Effect of Cadmium and Mercury on Catalase Activity of the Mudsnail (Cipangopaludina cathayensis)". Journal of Neijiang Normal University 4: 10. abstract.
 Li X. Y., Li Y., Zhou S. Q. & Yan B. L. (2010). "Analysis and evaluation of nutritional composition in two freshwater fingersnails". Food Science 31: 276–279. abstract.
  Shen J., Zhao Y., Li S. & Zhu G. (2013). 三种常用农药对环棱螺, 圆田螺和河蚬的急性毒性研究. "Acute toxicity of three common pesticides to Bellamya quadrata, Cipangopaludina cathayensis and Corbicula fluminea". Chinese Journal of Pesticide Science'' 15(5): 559–566. . abstract.

External links

Viviparidae
Gastropods described in 1890
Taxa named by Pierre Marie Heude